The Foot can refer to:
An episode of the first season of Six Feet Under.
The Foot Clan of Teenage Mutant Ninja Turtles.
The Foot Book
The Foot of Cupid
The Foot can refer to the 4 Grey Goose Bottles that are blocked on a back bar.
The Foot. (band)
The Foot, a movie that was in Diary of a Wimpy Kid: Rodrick Rules from the theatrical and DVD versions

See also
Foot in anatomy
Foot (disambiguation)